North Carolina Highway 906 (NC 906) is a primary state highway in the U.S. state of North Carolina. It serves as an access and evacuation route for Oak Island.

Route description
NC 906 begins as a two-lane road at Beach Drive, as Middleton Boulevard. Crossing over Davis Creek, it widens to a four-lane at Oak Island Drive (SR 1190). Continuing north as Midway Road, it goes back to two-lane as it goes through the communities of Suburb, Antioch and Half Hell. At US 17 Business (Old Ocean Highway), it does a brief  overlap and continues on along Galloway Road. NC 906 ends, after , at US 17 (Ocean Highway).

History
Discussion of a new state highway began in 2013, when State Senator Bill Rabon sent a letter to the NCDOT Division 3 Office asking for support to establish a new primary route along Midway Road.  The justification was the completion of Swain's Cut Bridge (November, 2011), highlighting that its another route to Oak Island as well as an evacuation route.  NCDOT Division 3 Office submitted a route change request in June 2014 and the town of Oak Island signed off in December 2015.  NC 906 was certified and established on January 26, 2016; traversing from Beach Drive (SR 1104), in Oak Island, to US 17, near Bolivia. It is the highest route number signed as a primary route in North Carolina.

Junction list

References

External links

Transportation in Brunswick County, North Carolina
906